Arthrostemma is a genus of flowering plants belonging to the family Melastomataceae.

Its native range is Mexico to Tropical America.

Species:

Arthrostemma alatum 
Arthrostemma ciliatum 
Arthrostemma cubense 
Arthrostemma parvifolium 
Arthrostemma primaevum

References

Melastomataceae
Melastomataceae genera